Stocksy United, also referred to as Stocksy or Stocksy United Photography, is a Victoria, British Columbia based platform cooperative that accepts and provides royalty-free stock photography and stock video. Stocksy uses a curated editing approach to select useful and authentic photos. The co-op differs from other stock photography firms by its stated focus on fair pay and creating sustainable careers for its members.

History
Stocksy United was founded April 20, 2012 and publicly launched on March 25, 2013. It was started by iStockphoto founder Bruce Livingstone and co-founder Brianna Wettlaufer. At the time of launch, Stocksy had about 220 contributing photographers, with plans to grow to approximately 500 photographers in its first year. Stocksy now has over 900 contributing members, selected from over 10,000 applications. Its revenue doubled from 2014 to 2015, to $7.9 million. For 2015, Stocksy paid out over half of its revenue as royalties to its contributors, totaling $4.3 million. Revenue for 2016 has grown to $10.7 million, with $4.9 million paid out to contributors. Total for the first four years of business, Stocksy has paid out over $20 million to their nearly 1,000 artists during the period from 2013 to 2017.

Cooperative structure 
Stocksy is a platform cooperative with three classes of shareholders. Class A is made up of advisors, including CEO Brianna Wettlaufer. Class B is made up of staff, and Class C is the artists who contribute content. Currently there are around 980 photographer shareholders in this category. Each member co-owns the cooperative and has one vote. Each class has at least two directors on the board.

Contributors
Contributing photographers live in 65 countries. After two years of closed membership, Stocksy's Call to Artists is now open. Achieving membership into the cooperative is a single step process whereby interested artists submit a portfolio using Stocksy's Call to Artists webpage. Accepted members license creative content and receive 50% royalties on standard license sales, 75% on extended license sales, and year-end profit sharing in the form of patronage returns.

References

External links 

 Official website

Stock photography
Photo archives in Canada
Cooperatives in Canada